Jensen Atwood (born August 25, 1976) is an American actor from South Central, Los Angeles. Atwood is best known for roles in television productions such as Oprah Winfrey Presents: Their Eyes Were Watching God,  Noah's Arc, and Dante's Cove.

Early life
Atwood was born and raised in South Central, Los Angeles where he currently resides. He has two younger sisters Monica Jones and Ashley Atwood and two older brothers Gilbert (Andy) Atwood and Jason (String) Atwood. He studied acting at California State University, Long Beach, at Playhouse West in Los Angeles, and with Eric Morris.

Career
Since beginning his show business career, Atwood has appeared in numerous music videos and stage productions. As a model, Atwood was featured on the cover of Krave, Bleu, and Ballroom Rockstar and appeared in a layout for Flaunt Magazine.  He has appeared in advertisements for brands such as Coors Light, KFC, K-Swiss, AT&T and has also sang backup for Tyrese.

In 2005 Atwood played Johnny Taylor, the love interest to Halle Berry in the ABC television film Oprah Winfrey Presents: Their Eyes Were Watching God. He is best known for his role in the Logo television series Noah's Arc as Wade Robinson. The critically-acclaimed Noah's Arc was the first TV series featuring Black gay men as main characters. In interviews, Atwood says that playing Wade was his most challenging role. He reprised the role of Wade in the show's 2008 spin-off film, Noah's Arc: Jumping the Broom.  In 2007, Atwood joined the cast of Here TV's Dante's Cove in its third season, playing the role of Griffen, a mage.

Filmography

Music videos

References

External links

Official website

1976 births
Living people
African-American male actors
American male television actors
Male actors from Los Angeles
American LGBT rights activists
Activists from California
21st-century African-American people
20th-century African-American people